Sibungor Island is an islet on the Brunei River in Brunei-Muara District, Brunei. A proposal for an  protection status to be implemented on the island. The island is home to proboscis monkeys and forest swamps.

Geography 
The islet sits at the confluence of the Brunei River and Butir River, with two navigational beacons located westwards. Moreover, an anchorage is also used west of Sibungor.

References 

Islands of Brunei